Agama mossambica, the Mozambique agama, is a species of lizard in the family Agamidae. It is a small lizard found in Tanzania, Malawi, Zambia, Mozambique, and Zimbabwe.

References

Agama (genus)
Reptiles described in 1854
Taxa named by Wilhelm Peters